The 1970 Kentucky Derby was the 96th running of the Kentucky Derby. The race took place on May 2, 1970.

The race is most notable in American popular culture as the setting for "The Kentucky Derby Is Decadent and Depraved", an article written for Scanlan's Monthly by Hunter S. Thompson that would later be identified as the first instance of gonzo journalism.

Full results

 Winning Breeder: Pullen Bros; (IL)

References

1970
Kentucky Derby
Derby
Kentucky
Kentucky Derby